The historical building of Au Café was built in Bratislava, Slovakia (then Pressburg, Kingdom of Hungary), in 1827, when it served as a coffee shop. For almost one hundred years it was a famous restaurant and coffee shop, when in the middle of the 20th century it was on decline. In 2003 Au Café was reopened.  Located on the bank of the Danube river, it serves as a restaurant and café at present.

History
 1827 Au Cafe, a new coffee shop is established on the right bank of the Danube
 1857 Ownership passes to Mr. Roth and in 1871 to landlord František Pohl
 1890 Anton Apfel adds a restaurant to the Au Cafe coffee shop
 1896 Karl von Palugyay elevates Au Cafe to introduce fine dining.
 1919 Otto Kolin becomes the new owner and gives Au Cafe a metropolitan style
 1927 from July 31 until August 18 celebrations of Au Cafe's 100th anniversary take place.
 1960 a long-term decline capped by demolition of the premises.
 2003 On September 12 Au Cafe reopened

See also
 History of Bratislava

References

External links
 Web page of Au Café restaurant

Buildings and structures in Bratislava
Commercial buildings completed in 1827
Restaurants in Slovakia
1827 establishments in the Austrian Empire
Coffeehouses and cafés